Thomas W. Lynch (born February 25, 1956 in Los Angeles, California) is an American television series creator and executive producer who is the head of his own production company, Tom Lynch Company (previously Lynch Entertainment which is owned by Lynch Pictures, as well as Lynch/Biller Productions with Gary Biller) based in Los Angeles, CA.

Career
The New York Times referred to him as "the David E. Kelley of Tween TV," a reference to his prolific array of successful television shows aimed at the 8- to 14-year-old age group. He has created several hit teenage/children's programs such as The Secret World of Alex Mack, The Journey of Allen Strange, and the drama series Caitlin's Way for Nickelodeon and the drama series Scout's Safari for Discovery Kids (which also aired on NBC during its original run on Discovery Kids).

Lynch also created the TBS music video series, Night Tracks, and the popular long-running syndicated/Disney Channel musical-variety series Kids Incorporated, which spawned the careers of several future stars such as Jennifer Love Hewitt and Stacy Ferguson (known as Fergie of the popular R&B group The Black Eyed Peas). Kids Incorporated was Lynch's first hit series. By the 1980s, Gary Biller was Lynch's partner, thus identifying it as Lynch/Biller Productions.

By the 2000s, he also executive produced the dramedy Sk8 and the ground-breaking teen drama Just Deal for NBC's TNBC Saturday morning lineup, the sitcoms 100 Deeds for Eddie McDowd and Romeo! for Nickelodeon, the drama South of Nowhere for Noggin's nighttime block "The N," the sci-fi series Galidor for YTV, and the animated musical series Class of 3000 for Cartoon Network. In 2009, Lynch executive produced two new series: the comedy series The Assistants for The N, and the sci-fi comedy The Troop for Nickelodeon.  The Troop filmed its second season and aired late 2010/early 2011.

In addition to his Emmy nomination for Outstanding Children's Series for Scout's Safari, Lynch's shows have been nominated for GLAAD Awards, Humanitas Prize, Kids Choice Awards, Teen Choice Awards, WGA Awards, DGA Awards, Image Awards, Gemini Awards, Leo Awards and Young Artists Awards.

Lynch has written pilots for a number of networks such as NBC, FX and CBS. He currently is in development on several projects for Nickelodeon, The N, MTV, Spike and Cartoon Network.

In 2011, Lynch executive-produced Bucket & Skinner's Epic Adventures for Nickelodeon.

In 2015, Lynch created Make It Pop starring Megan Lee, Louriza Tronco, Erika Tham, and Dale Whibley. It premiered on Nickelodeon on March 26. Make It Pop is renewed for a second Season and it premiered on January 4, 2016 with a Christmas special aired December 5, 2015. During the show's run, Lynch was criticized for making racist statements against Asians and saying he would never allow Asian men to be on his shows. 

In 2016, The Other Kingdom officially premiered April 10, 2016 on Nickelodeon and Lynch served as creator and executive producer of the show.

Personal life

Lynch and his sister Rachel were raised in Los Angeles where their father was a nuclear physicist. His parents divorced when he was eight.

Lynch is the father of four children.

Filmography

Television

References

External links
Tom Lynch Company website

Television producers from California
American television writers
American male television writers
Businesspeople from Los Angeles
Living people
1956 births
Screenwriters from California